The method of images (or method of mirror images) is a mathematical tool for solving differential equations, in which the domain of the sought function is extended by the addition of its mirror image with respect to a symmetry hyperplane. As a result, certain boundary conditions are satisfied automatically by the presence of a mirror image, greatly facilitating the solution of the original problem. The domain of the function is not extended.  The function is made to satisfy given boundary conditions by placing singularities outside the domain of the function. The original singularities are inside the domain of interest.  The additional (fictitious) singularities are an artifact needed to satisfy the prescribed but yet unsatisfied boundary conditions.

Method of image charges 

The method of image charges is used in electrostatics to simply calculate or visualize the distribution of the electric field of a charge in the vicinity of a conducting surface. It is based on the fact that the tangential component of the electrical field on the surface of a conductor is zero, and that an electric field E in some region is uniquely defined by its normal component over the surface that confines this region (the  uniqueness theorem).

Magnet-superconductor systems 

The method of images may also be used in magnetostatics for calculating the magnetic field of a magnet that is close to a superconducting surface. The superconductor in so-called Meissner state is an ideal diamagnet into which the magnetic field does not penetrate. Therefore, the normal component of the magnetic field on its surface should be zero. Then the image of the magnet should be mirrored. The force between the magnet and the superconducting surface is therefore repulsive.

Comparing to the case of the charge dipole above a flat conducting surface, the mirrored magnetization vector can be thought as due to an additional sign change of an axial vector.

In order to take into account the magnetic flux pinning phenomenon in type-II superconductors, the frozen mirror image method can be used.

Mass transport in environmental flows with non-infinite domains 
Environmental engineers are often interested in the reflection (and sometimes the absorption) of a contaminant plume off of an impenetrable (no-flux) boundary. A quick way to model this reflection is with the method of images.

The reflections, or images, are oriented in space such that they perfectly replace any mass (from the real plume) passing through a given boundary. A single boundary will necessitate a single image. Two or more boundaries produce infinite images. However, for the purposes of modeling mass transport—such as the spread of a contaminant spill in a lake—it may be unnecessary to include an infinite set of images when there are multiple relevant boundaries. For example, to represent the reflection within a certain threshold of physical accuracy, one might choose to include only the primary and secondary images.

The simplest case is a single boundary in 1-dimensional space. In this case, only one image is possible. If as time elapses, a mass approaches the boundary, then an image can appropriately describe the reflection of that mass back across the boundary.

Another simple example is a single boundary in 2-dimensional space. Again, since there is only a single boundary, only one image is necessary. This describes a smokestack, whose effluent "reflects" in the atmosphere off of the impenetrable ground, and is otherwise approximately unbounded.

Finally, we consider a mass release in 1-dimensional space bounded to its left and right by impenetrable boundaries. There are two primary images, each replacing the mass of the original release reflecting through each boundary. There are two secondary images, each replacing the mass of one of the primary images flowing through the opposite boundary. There are also two tertiary images (replacing the mass lost by the secondary images), two quaternary images (replacing the mass lost by the tertiary images), and so on ad infinitum.

For a given system, once all of the images are carefully oriented, the concentration field is given by summing the mass releases (the true plume in addition to all of the images) within the specified boundaries. This concentration field is only physically accurate within the boundaries; the field outside the boundaries is non-physical and irrelevant for most engineering purposes.

Mathematics 
This method is a specific application of Green's functions. The method of images works well when the boundary is a flat surface and the distribution has a geometric center. This allows for simple mirror-like reflection of the distribution to satisfy a variety of boundary conditions. Consider the solution  to satisfy the linear differential equation for any , but not necessarily the boundary condition.

Note these distributions are typical in models that assume a Gaussian distribution. This is particularly common in environmental engineering, especially in atmospheric flows that use Gaussian plume models.

Perfectly reflecting boundary conditions 
The mathematical statement of a perfectly reflecting boundary condition is as follows:

This states that the derivative of our scalar function  will have no derivative in the normal direction to a wall. In the 1D case, this simplifies to:

This condition is enforced with positive images so that:

where the  translates and reflects the image into place. Taking the derivative with respect to :

Thus, the perfectly reflecting boundary condition is satisfied.

Perfectly absorbing boundary conditions 
The statement of a perfectly absorbing boundary condition is as follows:

This condition is enforced using a negative mirror image:

And:

Thus this boundary condition is also satisfied.

References 

Electrodynamics
Electricity
Magnetism
Superconductivity